Birkot  is a village development committee in Palpa District in the Lumbini Zone of southern Nepal. At the time of the 1991 Nepal census it had a population of 3707 people living in 654 individual households.

References

Populated places in Palpa District